Ania Safonova is a Russian-Israeli   violinist, the Associate Concertmaster of the Royal Opera House, Covent Garden. She has recently been appointed as Director of the ManningCamerata Chamber Players.

Biography 
Safonova was born in Tomsk, Russia and began her violin studies at the age of five with Svetlana Goffman. She made her solo debut at the age of six with the Omsk Philharmonic Orchestra and the following year was a prizewinner at the Novosibirsk Violin Competition.

In 1990, her family emigrated to Israel where she studied at the Tel Aviv Conservatoire, playing as a soloist with the Tel Aviv Conservatoire Orchestra and the  Young Israel Philharmonic Orchestra.]. She was a member of the Mishkenot Sha'ananim Israel Chamber Music Unit (1991–1995), She won regular scholarships from the America-Israel Cultural Foundation and recorded for German Radio.

In 1996, she came to the UK and attained a full scholarship to study at the Purcell School of Music with  Felix Andrievsky, followed by four years at the Royal College of Music (1997–2001) with   Andrievsky and  Yossi Zivoni

Career 
Safonova was the associate Leader of the Halle Orchestra in Manchester from 2001 to 2006, and in 2008, was appointed Associate Concertmaster of the Royal Opera House, Covent Garden. She has performed at numerous concert series and festivals across the world, with ensembles such as the Nash Ensemble, London Bridge Ensemble, Razumovsky Ensemble and Fibonacci Sequence. Her most recent appointment has been as Director of the ManningCamerata Chamber Players.

Scholarships and Awards

 Queen Elizabeth the Queen Mother Scholarship
 English Speaking Union Tanglewood Scholarship
 Martin Musical Trust
 Worshipful Company of Musicians
 Maise Lewis Award (1999 Wigmore Hall debut)
 Kirkman Society (2003 Purcell Room debut)
 Winner of the Eastbourne Young Soloists Competition and soloist with the Royal Conservatory of Music Orchestra and the Halle Orchestra.

Role as Concertmaster
 Halle Orchestra
 BBC National Orchestra of Wales
 BBC Symphony Orchestra
 Scottish Chamber Orchestra
 Ulster Orchestra
 Aurora Orchestra
 Royal Liverpool Philharmonic
 Swedish Radio Symphony Orchestra
 Canterbury Cathedral Orchestra
 Jerusalem Festival Orchestra
 Schleswig-Holstin Festival Orchestra
 Arpeggione Chamber Orchestra (Austria)

References

External links 
 The Orchestra of the Royal Opera House, Covent Garden
 Ania Safonova, ASPECT foundation
 ManningCamerata

Year of birth missing (living people)
Living people
Israeli violinists
Alumni of the Royal College of Music
Russian emigrants to Israel
Women classical violinists
21st-century violinists
21st-century women musicians